Overworld is the third album by Swedish metal band Machinae Supremacy, released on 19 August 2008.

Track list
Official track listing released by the band.

"Overworld" – 4:21
"Need for Steve" – 4:11
"Edge and Pearl" – 4:00
"Radio Future" – 4:40
"Skin" – 5:24
"Truth of Tomorrow" – 4:35
"Dark City" – 5:56
"Conveyer" – 3:51
"Gimme More (SID)" – 3:32 (Britney Spears cover)
"Violator" – 3:04
"Sid Icarus" – 3:58 (Flight of the Toyota remake)
"Stand" – 4:47

References

2008 albums
Machinae Supremacy albums